Geranium palmatum, falsely called Canary Island geranium, is a species of flowering plant in the family Geraniaceae, native to the island of Madeira.

It dislikes heavy, wet soils, preferring a light, well-drained medium. It has won the Royal Horticultural Society's Award of Garden Merit.

References 

palmatum
Flora of Madeira
Endemic flora of Madeira
Taxa named by Antonio José Cavanilles